Ninshubur (Ninšubur, "Lady of Subartu" or "Lady of servants"), also spelled Ninšubura, was a Mesopotamian goddess whose primary role was that of the sukkal (divine vizier) of the goddess Inanna. While it is agreed that in this context Ninshubur was regarded as female, in other cases the deity was considered male, possibly due to syncretism with other divine messengers, such as Ilabrat. No certain information about her genealogy is present in any known sources, and she was typically regarded as unmarried. As a sukkal, she functioned both as a messenger deity and as an intercessor between other members of the pantheon and human petitioners.

Due to the belief that she could intercede with higher ranking deities, Ninshubur was popular in everyday religion, and many theophoric names invoking her and other references to personal worship are known. Her original cult center was Akkil, but in the Early Dynastic Period she was already worshiped in nearby Uruk. She was also introduced to the pantheon of the state of Lagash, where her cult center was Girsu. Many kings of this area regarded her as their personal deity. In the Ur III period she was also introduced to Ur. Further cities where Ninshubur was worshiped include Adab, Nippur, Malgium, and more.

In myths, Ninshubur is portrayed as a companion of Inanna and helps her during various exploits. In Inanna's Descent to the Netherworld, she is responsible for securing Inanna's return by pleading with Enlil, Nanna and Enki. After being resurrected, Inanna protects her from the galla demons sent to find someone to replace her in the land of the dead. Ninshubur's mourning is contrasted with Dumuzi's attitude which leads to his death in this composition. In Inanna and Enki, Ninshubur helps Inanna escape from Enki's servants after theft of the me.

Name 
Frans Wiggermann translates Ninshubur's name as "Lady of Subartu" or alternatively "Lady of servants" (or "Lady of Subarian servants") based on another meaning of šubur, "servant," and in reference to her role as a benevolent intercessory deity. Early translations, for example Wilfred G. Lambert's from 1976, which relied on two lexical texts from the first millennium BCE explaining it as bel erseti - "lord of the earth" or "lord of the underworld" - are regarded as erroneous, as no other sources explain the meaning of shubur as erseti. It is possible this uncommon understanding was based on a local tradition associating Ninshubur with Nergal. The Sumerian term Shubur or Subir (Subartu) designated areas north of Mesopotamia. Both in ancient documents and in past scholarship the terms "Subartu" and "Subarians" usually refer to Hurrians. Beate Pongratz-Leisten notes that Hurrians were never regarded as outsiders in Mesopotamian sources, unlike other neighboring groups such as the Gutians, most likely due to their culture also having an urban character. According to Tonia Sharlach, the inhabitants of Subartu were viewed as "neighbors whose language (and perhaps culture) were worthy of closer knowledge." It is possible that echoes of Ninshubur's association with Subartu survived as late as in the Neo-Assyrian period in texts pertaining to Papsukkal.

Two forms of Ninshubur's in the Emesal dialect are also known, Gashanshubur (referring to the female form of this deity) and Umunshubur (referring to the male one). The theonym Nin-ŠUBUR.AL, attested in documents from the Early Dynastic period, might be either an alternate form of Ninshubur's name or a separate, though similarly named, deity. Frans Wiggermann additionally argues that sometimes the name was rendered simply as "Shubur," but this assumption is not universally accepted.

Gender 
The modern consensus view among Assyriologists is that Ninshubur was always identified as a female deity when associated with Inanna. At the same time, many authors propose that Ninshubur was male when associated with Anu. While the second millennium BCE god list An = Anu ša āmeli explains that "Ninshubur is Papsukkal when Anu is concerned," Papsukkal being the name of a male messenger deity, Frans Wiggermann argues that the only texts from the third millennium BCE which identify Ninshubur's gender state that she was a goddess, rather than a god. Gábor Zólyomi also translates a passage related to Ninshubur's role as a servant of Anu as referring to a female deity. Texts from Lagash from the Early Dynastic period refer to Ninshubur exclusively as a goddess according to Toshiko Kobayashi. According to Marcos Such-Gutiérrez, the evidence from Adab is not entirely conclusive, though might point at the female version of this deity being worshiped there too, despite attested connection to Anu.

In most Akkadian texts Ninshubur was regarded as male, though it is possible exceptions did exist. According to Raphael Kutscher, Ninshubur might have been viewed as female in Malgium when worshiped alongside Ulmašītum, though Douglas Frayne treats this deity as male in his translation of an inscription from this location. In Old Babylonian and Kassite periods in Nippur Ninshubur was also considered female. However, whether her name on Kassite seals refers to a god or a goddess is presently unknown.

Uri Gabbay proposed that Ninshubur's identity was a mirror of the gala clergy, but this view is not supported by other researchers, as regardless of gender Ninshubur was never described as a gala, and the only similarity between her and the class of priests was their shared ability to appease specific deities. Wolfgang Heimpel suggested another solution, namely that three separate deities shared the same name, one female (according to him found for example in association with Inanna in Ur) and two male (one associated with Anu and yet another worshiped in Girsu), with no ambiguity of gender in any case. However, the matter of Ninshubur's gender was in some cases unclear to ancient scribes, with one Old Babylonian hymn (CBS 15119+) possibly being an attempt at reconciling conflicting accounts by describing Ninshubur (identified as female in this context by Frans Wiggermann) as dressed in both feminine (left side) and masculine (right side) robes.

The view that Ninshubur was male as a servant of An in Sumerian texts from the third millennium BCE relies on the widely accepted assumption that a deity's sukkal matched their gender. However, Amasagnudi, regarded as a goddess in known sources and in one case equated with female Ninshubur, was also said to be a sukkal of Anu in one Old Babylonian document. Ninshubur herself appears as the sukkal of Nergal instead of Ugur or Ishum (both of them male) in one Sumerian text dated to the Old Babylonian period.

Ninshubur was not the only Mesopotamian deity whose gender varied in ancient sources, other examples include Ninkasi (the deity of beer, female in earlier sources but at times male later on), the couple Ninsikila and Lisin, whose genders were in some instances switched around, Uṣur-amāssu, described as a son of Adad in the god list An = Anum but as his daughter in sources from Uruk from the first millennium BCE, and the Venus deity Ninsianna, whose varying gender might be connected to dual role as personification of both the morning star and the evening star.

Syncretism with male deities 
It has been proposed that the variance in Ninshubur's gender is related to syncretism with the male Akkadian god Ilabrat. In texts from the second millennium BCE, Ninshubur and Ilabrat coexisted. It is assumed that at least some cases Ninshubur's name, when treated as masculine, was a logographic spelling of Ilabrat's, for example in Mari in personal names. However, Ichiro Nakata nonetheless lists a single instance name from this city in which Ninshubur according to his analysis is treated as a female deity.

Ninshubur was additionally syncretised with Papsukkal, originally the sukkal of Zababa, tutelary god of Kish. Papsukkal's rise to prominence at the expense of other similar figures, such as Ninshubur, was likely rooted simply in the presence of the word sukkal in his name. While an association between the two is attested in the god list An = Anum already, the conflation was only finalized in the Seleucid period in Uruk. Papsukkal was not worshiped in that city in earlier periods, and in contrast with Ninshubur appeared only infrequently as a family deity or in personal names, but in the context of the so-called "antiquarian theology" relying largely on god lists, which developed in Uruk under Achaemenid rule, he was fully identified with Ninshubur and thus became Anu's sukkal and one of the eighteen major deities of the city. The late syncretic Papsukkal was not regarded as the sukkal of Anu and Ishtar, but rather Anu and Antu as a pair instead.

Despite the syncretism leading to perception of Ninshubur as a male deity, it is possible that the goddess Amasagnudi, worshiped alongside Papsukkal in Seleucid Uruk, was originally an epithet of (female) Ninshubur, a manifestation of her or at least a similar goddess sharing Ninshubur's role as sukkal of Anu. Frans Wiggermann translates Amasagnudi's name as "mother who cannot be pushed aside."

Julia Krul suggests that the conflation between two deities from the court of Enki, male Isimud and female Ara, might have been influenced by the similar process involving Ninshubur.

Attributes and iconography 

Ninshubur's attribute was a staff, a sign of her office as a sukkal representing right to rule granted to her by her masters, It is possible that it was believed Ninshubur therefore bestowed similar privileges upon kings. Other gods' divine viziers were depicted holding staffs too, including Alla (Ningishzida's), Isimud (Enki's) and Nuska (Enlil's). A sukkal was expected to walk in front of their master, leading the way with their staff. Other objects associated with Ninshubur include doors and shoes, and her epithet in a single source is "pure minister of the lapis lazuli shoes." According to Julia Krul, said title is bestowed upon Ninshubur by Inanna in a late variant of one of the city laments, and might reflect her "arduous travels in her lady's service."

Very few depictions of female Ninshubur have been identified with certainty, though it is possible she is the deity on seals of Lugal-ushumgal, governor of Lagash during the reigns of Naram-Sin of Akkad and his son Shar-Kali-Sharri. It is also known that during building rituals figures of Ninshubur were buried under temples of other gods in some cases . A letter-prayer possibly referring to a statue of Ninshubur mentions that the deity had a "face exuding allure," and describes Ninshubur's physique in terms similar to these sometimes applied to Inanna.

It has been proposed that in Girsu, where Ninshubur was regarded as the wife of Meslamtaea (Nergal), she can be identified as a goddess accompanied by his symbolic animal, the "lion-griffin," similar to how Geshtinanna was accompanied by mushussu, a symbol of her husband Ningishzida, and that on Old Babylonian seals the double lion-headed mace associated with Nergal might represent Ninshubur in the role of a deity related to him.

The constellation Orion, known in ancient Mesopotamia as Sipazianna, "the true shepherd of heaven," was regarded as the astral symbol of Ninshubur, as well as Ilabrat and Papsukkal.

Character
Ninshubur is regarded by Assyriologists as "the earliest and most important" sukkal, linked to the deities she served "not as cause and effect, but as command and execution." Her two main functions were these of "intercessory goddess" and "archetypal vizier of the gods." She served Inanna, but also Anu and by extension the entire divine assembly. The association with Anu is known from sources from the reign of Third Dynasty of Ur onward, and might be a secondary development, with Inanna being her primary and original mistress. As Inanna's sukkal, Ninshubur was believed to implement divine rules and regulations on her behalf. Her role as a popular intercessory deity in Sumerian religion was derived from her position as a servant of major deities, which resulted in the belief that she was capable of mediating with her masters on behalf of human petitioners. One hymn (CBS 14073) describes her as a servant of not only her usual masters, but also Enlil, Enki, Damgalnuna, Nanna, Ningal, Ninurta, Ninhursag and Utu. Frans Wiggermann notes that Ninshubur's association with the divine assembly treated as a whole indicates that even though she shared many of her roles with another sukkal, Nuska, she was ultimately considered the higher-ranked member of the pantheon.

In addition to her usual title, Ninshubur could also be called sukkal anna, "heavenly vizier." An inscription of Rim-Sîn I refers to her as a sukkalmaḫ. According to Frans Wiggermann, while this term is attested as an administrative rank and in this context refers to an official responsible for managing the activities of multiple people holding the rank of sukkal, there is no indication that it had a similar meaning when applied to deities, and in this context its use is most likely only meant to exalt the bearer. Ninshubur was also referred to as sukkalmaḫ in Malgium, though according to Raphael Kutscher in this case the use of this title should be considered the result of Elamite cultural influence. Ninshubur could also be referred to as SAL.ḪÚB2. This term is sparsely attested, and it assumed that it referred to a deity considered to be a sukkal who was viewed as emotionally close to their lord or lady. In most of cases SAL.ḪÚB2 appears in parallel with "sukkal." Ninshubur is the only deity referred to as SAL.ḪÚB2 in more than one or two sources, with seven instances known as of 2014. One of them is an Old Babylonian dedicatory inscription from the reign of Samsu-iluna. In another text, she is the "beloved SAL.ḪÚB2 of Inanna," and appears in a short list of members of her family right after Dumuzi.

A number of references to Ninshubur as the "mother of the land" are known. A theological text composed during the reign of the Third Dynasty of Ur states that "Ninshubur occupies the land" and includes her among the highest ranking gods, alongside Enlil, Ninlil, Nanna, Inanna, Enki, Nergal, Ninurta and Nuska. The deified hero Gilgamesh appears in it as well, seemingly to elevate his standing among gods due to his role in the royal ideology of that time period. Gábor Zólyomi notes that the one known hymn focusing on Ninshubur in the role of "mother of the land" (BL 195, known from the tablet Ash. 1911.326 from the Ashmolean Museum) employs multiple topoi related to abundance in Sumerian literature, for example building of cattle pens and sheepfolds under her command, otherwise not associated with her. Another hymn (CBS 14073) mentions both her role as a divine vizier and that of "mother of the land." In addition to this metaphorical role, Ninshubur was also referred to as a "mother" in personal names. However, references to her as an actual "birth mother" are uncommon and unusual according to Julia M. Asher-Greve.

Some hymns indicate that the role of a divine healer was occasionally ascribed to Ninshubur.

Association with other deities 
No clear evidence exists regarding Ninshubur's parentage. In early sources she usually did not have a spouse.

Ninshubur and Inanna 
Ninshubur, under the variant name Nin-Akkil ("lady of Akkil"), is already regarded as a servant of Inanna in the zami hymn from Early Dynastic Abu Salabikh. Frans Wiggermann describes the relation between them as very close. It was believed that Inanna bestowed Ninshubur's titles upon her and made her a sukkal. In one text, Inanna addressed Ninshubur endearingly as "my mother." In another, she is called the "beloved vizier" and appears right after Dumuzi and before other relatives. Ninshubur was regarded as a guardian of Inanna's secrets and as her adviser, though according to one text the latter could scoff at offered advice, both incorrect and correct. Ninshubur was also capable of "appeasing" Inanna, and one of her epithets was "who flatters the heart of Inanna." Various epithets related to this function are preserved in the god list An = Anum. Additionally, a temple dedicated to her whose location is not presently known bore the name E-šatezu, "house which knows the soothing of the heart." It is attested in a hymn dedicated to king Shulgi, though it is uncertain if it corresponds to structures dedicated to Ninshubur mentioned in texts from his reign.

The role of a mediator between a major deity and worshipers played by Ninshubur in the cult of Inanna has been compared to that played by the spouses of other major gods, for example Aya in the relation to Shamash or Shala in relation to Adad.

Sumerian literary catalogs list at least 7 hymns dedicated to Ninshubur which based on surviving incipits described her lamenting over something that happened to Inanna.

Ninshubur and Lamma goddesses 

Ninshubur was associated with the Lamma class of goddesses, likely due to their shared role in intercession between mortals and higher ranking gods. An association with Lamma was also attributed to Nanaya, regarded as "lady of Lamma." She was viewed as a servant of Inanna much like Ninshubur, and in god lists, for example in the Weidner god list, she usually appears after the latter, before any further related deities (such as Kanisurra, Gazbaba or Bizilla).

Julia M. Asher-Greve explains the purpose of Lamma as that of "protective and tutelary goddesses" and notes that they are the figures most commonly appearing in so-called "presentation scenes" in ancient Mesopotamian art, in which a minor goddess (Lamma) leads a human to a seated major deity. Lamma could also be a designation for specific goddesses in contexts in which their functions were analogous to these usually fulfilled by this category of deities, with Gudea occasionally calling the Anuna (a collective term for the major deities) gods "Lamma of all countries." The nature of Lamma can be compared to that of the modern concept of guardian angel.

Other associations 
In Girsu, Ninshubur was the spouse of Meslamtaea, a name used to refer to Nergal in early sources from southern Mesopotamian cities. Marcos Such-Gutiérrez notes that it is possible that this tradition was also known in Adab, where Ninshubur appears alongside Meslamtaea in two lists of offerings. Frans Wiggermann notes that the pairing of Nergal with Ninshubur is unusual, as she was the only goddess sometimes regarded as his wife who had a well defined role other than that of his spouse, the other exception being Ereshkigal. He assumes that since many of Nergal's attested spouses, such as Mammitum or Admu, were possibly associated with the earth, this role of Ninshubur was tied to her function as "lady of the earth." No other examples of Ninshubur being regarded as another deity's wife are known. A single source refers to Ninshubur as Nergal's sukkal rather than wife. Dina Katz on the basis of the connection between those two deities suggests that a tradition connecting Ninshubur to the underworld might have existed in early periods, but notes that no potential references to it occur in any sources postdating the Old Babylonian period.

In Mari Kakka, a local healing goddess, attested only in personal names, was associated with Ninshubur, but also with the medicine goddess Ninkarrak. This deity most likely should be regarded as distinct from Kakka, the sukkal of Anshar, known from the god list An = Anum, where the medicine goddess Kakka appears separately in Ninkarrak's section, and from the later myth Enuma Elish. Ninshubur was identified with the latter Kakka in An = Anum but only in the specific role of "one who holds the great scepter."

A single Old Babylonian letter associates Ninshubur with Lugalnamtarra, a deity possibly analogous to Namtar, and invokes both of them to bless the recipient. Lugalnamtarra, as well as a deity whose name was written as dSUKKAL, who according to Odette Boivin might be analogous to Ninshubur, both appear in association with Shamash in texts from the archives of the First Sealand dynasty in place of his usual attendants (such as Bunene). Akurduana, one of the kings of Sealand, included the title "servant of Utu and Ninshubur" in his royal titulature. In Isin, Ninshubur was seemingly instead incorporated into the entourage of the medicine goddess Ninisina. Frans Wiggermann states an attestation of Ninshubur appearing alongside Alammuš in the court of Nanna is also known. In Malgium in the Old Babylonian period, she seemingly fulfilled the role of a sukkal in relation to Ulmašītum.

In a greeting formula in a latter from Old Babylonian Larsa, Ninshubur is paired with the otherwise unknown goddess Mārat-ūmi, "daughter of the day" or "daughter of the storm". In a single incantation dated to the end of the third millennium BCE, possibly a part of a building ritual, she appears alongside the divine potter Nunura. She is rare in magical texts otherwise, though she is attested in an incantation from the Ur III period alongside Asalluhi, and in a late liver omen text "hand of Ninshubur" is listed one of the possible diagnoses.

Worship 
There is also evidence for creation of cult statues and votive offerings dedicated to Ninshubur from various locations in the Early Dynastic period already. Due to her intercessory role, she was popular in the sphere of personal worship, for example as a family deity. She was also among the deities invoked in theophoric names in many periods. Sometimes her title sukkal anna, written with a dingir sign in front of it like theonyms, was used in them too.

Akkil, Uruk and Badtibira
Akkil, where Ninshubur was associated with Inanna, was considered her primary cult center. Nin-Akkil ("lady of Akkil"), a name found in documents from the Early Dynastic period and from the reign of Third Dynasty of Ur, likely refers to her. She is the goddess of this location in the Temple Hymns, though Walther Sallaberger notes that she can be considered one of the members of a group of deities associated with Uruk in this context nonetheless, similar to Dumuzi and Ningirima. Frans Wiggermann is uncertain if Akkil should be interpreted as a town or as a temple, and favors the latter interpretation due to lack of references to it in economic texts, but Joan Goodnick Westenholz in a more recent publication concludes it was a town located close to Bad-tibira. Ninshubur's temple located in that settlement was E-(a)akkil, whose name has been translated as "house of lamentation" by Andrew R. George. The city is to be distinguished from a temple of Papsukkal in Kish also known as Akkil, and a from a sanctuary of Manungal, the goddess of prisons, also bearing such a name. A number of objects dedicated to "Ninshubur of Akkil" are known, including artifacts from the Early Dynastic period and a vessel inscribed by a sanga priests of Inanna from Uruk in the Ur III period.

In the Early Dynastic period Ninshubur's cult was already established in Uruk, as indicated by votive inscriptions, and it is considered possible that it was transferred there from Akkil. She continues to appear in sources from this city in the Ur III period, when Shulgi built a new temple dedicated to her there. A year name of either this king or his predecessor Ur-Nammu mentions the building of a ""temple kitchen of Ninshubur, which might be related to a foundation tablet dedicated to her from Uruk, though this remains uncertain.

A document from the reign of Shu-Sin indicates that Ninshubur was also worshiped in Bad-tibira.

Lagash and Girsu

Ninshubur is well attested in sources from the state of Lagash. Offerings were typically made to her in the city of Girsu. She was already worshiped there when the area was under the rule of Lugalanda (around 2400 BCE), during whose reign she was celebrated during festivals of Nanshe and Ningirsu and received offerings from the king's wife, Barnamtarra. There is no evidence pertaining to Ninshubur from the reign of Lugalanda's predecessor Enentarzi, which makes it possible she a deity worshiped by commoners at first, and only started to receive offerings from the official administration during the period of the latter monarch's rule. A temple dedicated to her, E-ešbarmeluḫḫa, "house of decisions which cleans the me," existed in Girsu. It is possible, though not certain, that E-mekilibbasagil, "house which lifts on high all the me," known from later royal inscriptions, was also located in this city.

A later ruler of Lagash, Urukagina, regarded Ninshubur as his personal deity. In offering lists from his reign she was placed above Mesandu, who possibly had an analogous role during the reigns of earlier local kings. Puzer-Mama, who ruled Lagash around 2200 BCE, mentions Ninshubur in his royal inscriptions, possibly in reference to Urukagina's reverence for her, as it is likely that they came from the same family and thus shared the same personal goddess, though he might also have considered her a divine mediator guaranteeing Lagash its territorial rights, regained from Akkadian rulers. Another ruler of Lagash who regarded her as his personal goddess was Nammahani, brother in law of Gudea. Gudea himself referred to Ninshubur as his nin ("mistress"). Statues dedicated for the life of a ruler to Ninshubur and to Ningishzida are also known from the periods of Nammahani's and Ur-Ningirsu II's rule.

Only a single theophoric name invoking Ninshubur is known from the Lagash area, Ninshubur-amamu ("Ninshubur is my mother").

Ur and Enegi
Ninshubur is first attested in Ur in the Ur III period. E-ninbitum ("house fit for a lady"), a temple dedicated to her, or according to Wolfgang Heimpel a cella in Inanna's temple, is attested in texts from this city. It might be the same temple as E-aggasummmu, "house which gives decrees," also presumed to be located in Ur. Shulgi referred to her as "mistress." However, she does not appear in the official cultic calendars and offering lists from this location from the reign of his dynasty, despite being a popular deity, which according to Julia M. Asher-Greve can be compared to Nanshe's position in the local pantheon. References to "Ninshubur of Enegi" appear in texts from Ur as well. It has been suggested she was introduced to the latter city from Uruk, as the local pantheon included other typically Urukean deities as well, such as the demigod Gilgamesh and his mother Ninsun. References to her receiving offerings there appear in texts from Puzrish-Dagan too. In one case, Ninshubur of Enegi is called the "small Ninshubur" (Ninshubur-banda), in contrast with Ninshubur of Akkil or Uruk, referred to as "great Ninshubur" (Ninshubur-gula).

During excavations of Ur, chapels of Ninshubur and Hendursaga, as well as votive objects to dedicated to them from Isin-Larsa period have been found. It is uncertain if a statue found in the Ninshubur chapel represents any deity, or a human. for example a princess or en priestess, though it has been noted that she lacks the horned crown associated with divinity. A letter-prayer to Ninshubur (UET  6/1, 7) which indicates that such texts were presented to a statue of the deity, is also assumed to be from Ur, though it is regarded as likely that it was sent by a king of Larsa, possibly Rim-Sîn I. Records indicate that he built temples of both female and male Ninshubur. In an inscription commemorating the building of a temple of Ninshubur in Ur, he refers to this deity as a goddess, while in a later one commemorating the defeat of Uruk - as a god. It is likely he was particularly devoted to this deity.

Other cities
Ninshubur appears in sources from Nippur in the Early Dynastic period already, and it is possible she was introduced to the local pantheon directly from Akkil, like in the case of Uruk. In the Old Babylonian period, she received offerings in the temple complexes of Enlil and Ninurta. Her temple in this city was Eakkilduku, "house of lamentation, the pure mound." It is possible it can be identified with a nameless sanctuary mentioned in an inscription dated to the reign of Ibbi-Sin.

Since before the Sargonic period, Ninshubur was also present in the pantheon of Adab. Meskigal, a ruler of this city, considered her his personal deity and dedicated a statue to her for the life of himself, his wife and children. A document dealing with distribution of bread to the Adab's temples indicates that one of them was dedicated to Ninshubur, and that its staff included a nin-dingir priestess. While Ninshubur's position in offering lists indicates she was a major deity in the local pantheon, very few theophoric names invoking her are attested.

Ninshubur is also attested in Early Dynastic texts from Shuruppak, the cult center of Sud. In Umma, she was worshiped alongside Inanna of Zabalam.

According to Jennie Myers, Ninshubur is also attested in Sippar, where the theonym according to her should be read phonetically in Sumerian names, and as "Ilabrat" in less common Akkadian ones. The worship of Ninshubur in this city is no longer attested after the reign of Sin-Muballit. The reasons behind this are unknown.

In Malgium, a kingdom located to the south of Eshnunna, Ninshubur was worshiped in a temple built by the local king Takil-ilissu in the Old Babylonian period. An inscription states that various festivals dedicated to this deity were held in the courtyard of the temple of Ulmašītum, which bore the ceremonial name Emaš (possibly erroneous writing of Eulmaš). In the same text Ninshubur is invoked in a curse formula alongside Anu, Ulmašītum, Annunitum, and the lions Dan-bītum and Rašub-bītum to guarantee that nobody removes Takil-ilissu's name from the foundation of the temple.

Other cities where Ninshubur was worshiped include Akkad (in the Sargonic period), Isin, Larsa, Mari and Nerebtum (possibly Tell Ishchali) in the Old Babylonian period, and later on Babylon and Kish, but it is difficult to tell if the deity in mention was female Ninshubur, male Ninshubur, or Ilabrat.

Mythology 
In literary texts, Ninshubur frequently accompanies Inanna.

Inanna's descent to the Netherworld
Ninshubur appears in the myth Inanna s Descent to the Netherworld. It is presently known from a total of fifty eight copies from the Old Babylonian period, with most found during excavations in Ur and Nippur, as well as from a fragment from the Middle Babylonian period. It is assumed it belonged to the curriculum of scribal schools. However, no first millennium BCE examples are known.

Before Inanna embarks on her journey to the land of the dead, seemingly motivated by a desire to take over it, she instructs Ninshubur what to do if she will not return after three days. It is assumed that this scene is supposed to establish that she is not going to be trapped in the underworld permanently. After this period time passes, Ninshubur, following her mistress' instructions, mourns her death by lamenting and wearing rags and pleads with the gods Enlil, Nanna and Enki in an effort to persuade them to rescue Inanna. In all three cases, she repeats the same formula:

Victor Hurowitz considered it possible that the terms which Ninshubur uses to illustrate the possible dreadful fate of Inanna in the netherworld during her attempts to persuade other gods to help her might be a mythical reflection of a ritual of renewal of a damaged statue. While the first two gods Ninshubur approaches, Enlil and Nanna, refuse to help her, she eventually manages to secure the aid of Enki. He creates two beings, galatura and kurĝara, who subsequently bring Inanna back.

After Inanna returns to the world of the living, Ninshubur, who was waiting at the gates of the underworld, throws herself at her feet. The term ganzir, used to refer to this location in this passage, is sparsely attested in Sumerian literature, only appearing in Gilgamesh, Enkidu and the Underworld otherwise. The galla demons accompanying Inanna suggest they can take Ninshubur to replace her in the underworld, but she protests:

Since Ninshubur is a faithful servant who mourned her properly, the demons are therefore not allowed to take her. She also does not allow them to take two further servants they meet, Shara and Lulal. Eventually they reach Dumuzi's city Bad-tibira, where it turns out that he did not mourn Inanna's death, which angers her. His behavior, contrasted with Ninshubur's (as well as Shara's and Lulal's), is meant to justify his eventual fate. Inanna lets the galla take him away. Ninshubur is not mentioned in the surviving lines of the remaining section of the narrative, which is focused on Dumuzi's attempt at escaping his fate and his confinement in the underworld.

Alhena Gadotti notes that an "inverted parallelism" exists between the role of Ninshubur in Inanna's Descent and that of Gilgamesh in another composition dealing with similar themes, Gilgamesh, Enkidu and the Underworld: in the former, a servant seeks help on behalf of her mistress, while in the latter text the roles are reversed, and it is Gilgamesh who wants to bring his companion Enkidu back. Dina Katz suggests that since Inanna's Descent was a widely circulated text, it is plausible that this part of the latter narrative was in part inspired by it.

Papsukkal takes Ninshubur's role in an Akkadian adaptation of Inanna's Descent focused on the counterpart of Inanna, Ishtar, but he is not directly designated as her personal servant, and the text states that he was serving "the great gods" as a group.

Inanna and Enki
In the myth Inanna and Enki, Ninshubur assists her mistress in escaping from enemies sent after her by Enki in the Boat of Heaven, ma2an-na, also referred to as the "Both of An" in modern literature. The name of the boat is also attested in a fragment of an otherwise unknown narrative about Inanna and Enmerkar and in texts from Puzrish-Dagan, where it appears in association with Inanna and Nanaya during a festival, and in lists of offerings from Old Babylonian Isin, Larsa and Nippur.

After Inanna's theft of the me, Enki's monstrous servants attack the boat six times, but each time she repeats the formula "water has not touched your hands, water has not touched  your feet" to Ninshubur, which according to Bendt Alter is meant to indicate that as long as the stay out of water they are out of the reach of Enki. After successfully escaping, they reach Uruk, and Ninshubur asks Inanna where she plans to unload the stolen items. The rest of the myth is poorly preserved.

Poem of Agushaya

In an Akkadian myth known under the title Poem of Agushaya or Hymn of Agushaya Ninshubur is tasked with providing Ishtar (the counterpart of Inanna) with information about the fearsome Saltu ("discord"), an opponent Ea (the counterpart of Enki) created for her, meant to serve as her mirror image. A peculiarity of this text are recurring misspellings of specific words in Ninshubur's speech. While it has been proposed that they are simply scribal errors, Benjamin R. Foster assumes this is implausible as all of them occur in two successive lines, and proposes that they were employed purposely to represent Ninshubur stuttering in shock due to Saltu's fearsome nature and her resemblance to Ishtar, translating the text accordingly:

Gallery

References

Bibliography

External links 

Compositions dedicated to Ninshubur in the Electronic Text Corpus of Sumerian Literature
Inana's descent to the nether world in the ETCSL
Inana and Enki in the ETCSL
Ancient Mesopotamian Gods and Goddesses: Papsukkal (god)

Mesopotamian goddesses
Mesopotamian gods
Messenger goddesses
Wisdom goddesses
LGBT themes in mythology
Inanna